The Basilica of Our Lady of l'Épine, also known as Notre-Dame de l'Épine, is a Roman Catholic basilica in the small village of L'Épine, Marne, near Châlons-en-Champagne and Verdun. It is a major masterpiece in the Flamboyant Gothic style.

History

Started around 1405-1406, construction lasted until 1527. 
Elevated to a basilica from 1914, Notre-Dame-de-l'Épine takes its name from the devotion given to a statue of the Virgin holding the Child Jesus.
According to a legend from the 17th century that has since evolved, the statue was found by shepherds in the Middle Ages in a burning thorn bush. 
The basilica has the dimensions of a cathedral and is in the Gothic architectural tradition.
The façade has three portals and is crowned with two spires.
The left spire was leveled in 1798 to allow the installation of a Claude Chappe telegraph.
It was rebuilt in 1868.

The basilica was classified a historic monument in 1840.
In 1998 it was registered on the World Heritage List by UNESCO under the title of "roads to St Jacques de Compostela in France".
Notre-Dame de l'Épine has always struck travelers and inspired writers, especially Victor Hugo, Alexandre Dumas, 
Joris-Karl Huysmans, Paul Claudel and Paul Fort.

Furnishings

The basilica has remarkable gargoyles.
Inside is a rood screen of the late 15th century, whose right arcade houses the statue of the Virgin for which this basilica is famous.

Statues include the Venerated Virgin (about 1300), seated virgin (15th century) and St. Jacques in wood (17th century). 
The altars date from 1542, and the triumph crucifix from the 16th century. 
The tribune and organ case are 16th century.
The tribune is decorated with eight apostles and seven pagan gods (inscriptions added in 1825 by Father Brisson). 
The choir organ is from Merklin. Stained glass is from the 19th and 20th centuries, mainly manufactured by the Champigneulle house.

Gallery

References
Citations

Sources

External link
 Page du télégraphe Chappe

Flamboyant Gothic
Gothic architecture in France
Churches in Marne (department)
World Heritage Sites in France
Basilica churches in France
Churches completed in 1527